Hufnagle is a surname. Notable people with the surname include:

Bill Hufnagle, American motorcyclist, cookbook writer, and television personality
Paul Hufnagle (1936–2017), American businessman and politician

See also
Hufnagel
Americanized surnames